Miss World Poland is a national Beauty pageant in Poland to select the official ambassador of Poland at the Miss World pageant.

Titleholders

Big Four pageants representatives

Miss World Poland 
Color key

See also 

 Miss Polski
 Miss Polonia
 Miss Earth Poland

References

External links
Official Website

Beauty pageants in Poland
Polish awards